Lori Black (born April 9, 1954), also known as Lorax, is an American musician born in Santa Monica, California. She played bass for Clown Alley and for the rock band Melvins.

Her father was the businessman Charles Alden Black and her mother was Shirley Temple, the popular 1930s child actress who became a diplomat in adulthood.

Early life 
Lori Black was born on April 9, 1954, at Santa Monica Hospital in Santa Monica, California. She is the second child of businessman Charles Black and Shirley Temple. She has a half sister, Susan, and a brother, Charles Alden Black Jr.

Melvins 
When Seattle grunge pioneers the Melvins temporarily disbanded in late 1987, bassist Matt Lukin left the band to form Mudhoney. The Melvins replaced him with Lori Black. At the time, Melvins frontman Buzz Osborne was dating Black, and the idea developed to have her play bass for the band. The first recording to feature Black's work was 1989's Ozma. Black is also credited with playing on the band's major label debut Houdini in 1993, though Osborne has said Black did not play on it.

Discography

with Melvins 
 Ozma (1989)
 Your Choice Live 012 (1991)
 Bullhead (1991)
 Here She Comes Now/Venus in Furs (1991, Split with Nirvana)
 Eggnog (1991)
 Singles 1–12 (Tracks "Theme" and "Way of the World", released 1996–1997)
 Neither Here nor There (Tracks 3, 8 & 12, released 2004)
 Pick Your Battles (Tracks 1–8, recorded circa 1989, released 2009)

with Clown Alley 
 Circus of Chaos (1985)

References

External links 
 Lori Black bio (slightly out-of-date)

1954 births
20th-century American bass guitarists
21st-century American bass guitarists
Alternative metal bass guitarists
American people of Dutch descent
American people of English descent
American people of German descent
American punk rock bass guitarists
Grunge musicians
Guitarists from California
Living people
Melvins members
Musicians from Santa Monica, California
Shirley Temple
Women bass guitarists
21st-century American women
Women in punk
Women in metal